FC Zaria-2 is the reserve team of Zaria which is based in Bălți, Moldova. They play in the Divizia A, the second tier of Moldovan football.

History
Until 2011, the club was called "FC Olimpia-2 Tiligul". After that, it was called FC Olimpia 2 and now FC Zaria-2.

Honours
Divizia B
 Winners (1): 1994–95

External links
 Official website

Zaria-2
Bălți
CSF Bălți
Association football clubs established in 1994
1994 establishments in Moldova